Lawrence may refer to:

Education

Colleges and universities
 Lawrence Technological University, a university in Southfield, Michigan, United States
 Lawrence University, a liberal arts university in Appleton, Wisconsin, United States

Preparatory & high schools
 Lawrence Academy at Groton, a preparatory school in Groton, Massachusetts, United States
 Lawrence College, Ghora Gali, a high school in Pakistan
 Lawrence School, Lovedale, a high school in India
 The Lawrence School, Sanawar, a high school in India

Research laboratories
 Lawrence Berkeley National Laboratory, United States
 Lawrence Livermore National Laboratory, United States

People
 Lawrence (given name), including a list of people with the name
 Lawrence (surname), including a list of people with the name

 Lawrence (band), an American soul-pop group
 Lawrence (judge royal) (died after 1180), Hungarian nobleman, Judge royal 1164–1172
 Lawrence (musician), Lawrence Hayward (born 1961), British musician
 Saint Lawrence (died 258), deacon and Roman Catholic saint, born in Spain
 Lawrence I (bishop of Milan), bishop of Milan from 490 to c. 511, Roman Catholic saint
 Lawrence, Archbishop of Split (died 1099), Benedictine monk and Archbishop of Split 1060–1099
 Brother Lawrence (died 1691), Carmelite friar

Places

Australia
 Lawrence, New South Wales
 Lawrence Rocks, Victoria, Australia

United States
 Lawrence, Illinois
 Lawrence, Indiana
 Lawrence, Kansas
 Lawrenceburg, Kentucky, formerly known as Lawrence
 Lawrence, Massachusetts
 Lawrence, Michigan
 Lawrence, Minnesota
 Lawrence, Mississippi
 Lawrence, Nebraska
 Lawrence Brook, New Jersey
 Lawrence, Nassau County, New York, a village
 Lawrence, St. Lawrence County, New York, a town
 Lawrence, Pennsylvania
 Lawrence, Texas
 Lawrence, Utah
 Lawrence, Washington
 Lawrence, Brown County, Wisconsin, a town
 Lawrence, Marquette County, Wisconsin, an unincorporated community
 Lawrence, Rusk County, Wisconsin, a town

Other places
 Lawrence (electoral district), Ontario, Canada
 Lawrence Pond, a community in Conception Bay South, Newfoundland, Canada
 Lawrence, New Zealand

Ships
 , a brig which acted as Commodore Oliver Perry's flagship
 , a brig decommissioned in 1846
 , a 400-ton Bainbridge-class destroyer commissioned in 1903 and serving until 1920
 , a Clemson-class destroyer, serving from 1921 to 1945
 , a Charles F. Adams-class destroyer commissioned in 1962, and serving through 1994
 Lawrence (schooner), a schooner launched in 1756

Transport
 Lawrence (Amtrak station), Lawrence, Kansas, U.S.
 Lawrence (Caltrain station) in Santa Clara, California, U.S.
 Lawrence (MBTA station) in Lawrence (near Boston), Massachusetts, U.S.
 Lawrence Avenue in Toronto, Ontario, Canada
 Lawrence station (Toronto), a Lawrence Avenue subway station
 Lawrence West station, a Lawrence Avenue subway station
 Lawrence East station, a Lawrence Avenue subway station
 Lawrence station (CTA), a rapid transit station in Chicago, Illinois, U.S.

Other uses
 Lawrence (crater), a lunar impact crater
 The Lawrence, a newspaper founded 1881
 Lawrence v. Texas, a major Supreme Court of the United States decision

See also
 
 Larry (disambiguation)
 Laurence, a given name and surname
 Laurens (disambiguation)
 Lawrance (disambiguation)
 Lawrence Academy (disambiguation)
 Lawrence County (disambiguation)
 Lawrence Station (disambiguation)
 Lawrence Township (disambiguation)
 Lawrie (name)
 Lawrenceburg (disambiguation)
 Lawrenceville (disambiguation)
 Saint Lawrence (disambiguation)